Phaecasiophora attica is a moth of the family Tortricidae. It is found in India (Assam), China, Burma, Thailand, Taiwan, Vietnam and Japan.

The forewings are deep blackish fuscous, slightly mottled with greyish. The posterior half of the wing has an orange-tawny area. The hindwings are dark fuscous bronze.

References

Moths described in 1907
Olethreutini
Moths of Japan